Xiaoquan (Michael) Zhang is Associate Dean of Innovation and Impact and Professor of Decision Sciences and Managerial Economics at the Business School, Chinese University of Hong Kong (CUHK). He serves as a Senior Editor at Information Systems Research and an Associate Editor at Management Science, two of the most prestigious management journals.

Biography
He is a graduate of MIT Sloan School of Management and the Tsinghua University. He has a PhD degree in Management, a Master of Science degree in Management, a Bachelor of Arts degree in English, and a Bachelor of Engineering degree in Computer Science.

Prior to joining the academia, he worked as a financial analyst and an international marketing manager.

His research topics are related to: (1) IT in financial markets: artificial intelligence, disclosure, governance; (2) Online advertising: word-of-mouth, position auctions; (3) Social media: incentives and biases, information environment for managers/investors; and (4) Information goods: pricing, innovation incentives, long tail.

His research works have been accepted by prestigious journals such as American Economic Review, Marketing Science, Management Science (journal), Management Information Systems Quarterly, Information Systems Research, and Journal of Marketing.

Michael Zhang was a co-founder of the MIT BBS, one of the most popular online social networks for Chinese-speaking people in the US. The Wall Street Journal reported this online community in 2004.

External links
 Michael Zhang's Home Page
 

Living people
Hong Kong economists
Information systems researchers
Academic staff of the Chinese University of Hong Kong
MIT Sloan School of Management alumni
Tsinghua University alumni
Year of birth missing (living people)